Aïn Djasser is a town in north-eastern Algeria.

Localities  of the commune 

The commune of Aïn Djasser  is composed of 6 localities:

References

Communes of Batna Province